Wilhelm Kreuz (born 29 May 1949), nicknamed "Willy" or "Willi", is a former Austrian footballer.

Club career
During his club career he played for Admira Energie (1966–1972), Sparta Rotterdam (1972–1974), Feyenoord Rotterdam (1974–1978), and SK VÖEST Linz (1978–1982).

He is placed as 76th best Feyenoord player ever in the book "De Top en Flop 100".

International career
He made his debut for Austria in an April 1969 World Cup qualification match against Cyprus and was a participant at the 1978 FIFA World Cup. He earned 56 caps, scoring 12 goals. His last international was a June 1981 World Cup qualification match against Finland.

Honours

Playing
Austrian Bundesliga top goalscorer (1):
 1971

Coaching
Austrian Cup (1):
 1991

References

External links
Profile - SK VÖEST
Profile - Feyenoord Fansite 

1949 births
Living people
Austrian footballers
FC Admira Wacker Mödling players
Sparta Rotterdam players
Feyenoord players
Austrian Football Bundesliga players
Eredivisie players
Austria international footballers
1978 FIFA World Cup players
Austrian expatriate footballers
Expatriate footballers in the Netherlands
Austrian expatriate sportspeople in the Netherlands
Footballers from Vienna
FC Admira Wacker Mödling managers
FC Linz managers
Association football forwards
Austrian football managers